Steven J. Wolfe is a producing partner and owner of Sneak Preview Entertainment, the Hollywood film production and talent management company he founded in 1993 with Lynette Prucha Chavez, a long-time friend and business associate. Wolfe continues to develop and package an eclectic slate of new indie film projects.

Wolfe’s film, "Twin Falls Idaho" was acquired by Sony Pictures Classics at its world premiere in the 1999 Sundance Film Festival. The story of young woman who finds herself with feelings for one of two, adult conjoined twins, "Twin Falls" is the debut feature of award winning writers Mark and Michael Polish, identical twin brothers who play the role of conjoined twins Blake and Francis in the film, with Michael directing as well. “Twin Falls” won the Special Jury Prize at the Deauville Film Festival and was nominated for Two Independent Spirit Awards including Best First Film over $500,000.

Filmography
Valley Girl (2020 - producer)
Fatherland (producer)
Landed (2019-2020 TV series - producer)
Sallywood (producer)
Everything But a Man (2019 - producer)
Ray Meets Helen (2017 - producer)
Baggage Claim (2013 - producer)
The Secret Lives of Dorks (2013 - producer)
What My Husband Doesn't Know (2012 - associate producer)
Our Family Wedding (2010 - producer)
Miss March (2009 - producer)
(500) Days of Summer (2009 - producer)
Beautiful Loser (2008 - executive producer / producer)
A Dennis the Menace Christmas (2007 - producer)
Phat Girlz (2006 - producer)
The Civilization of Maxwell Bright (2005 - producer)
When Do We Eat? (2005 - producer)
Hellbent (2004 - producer)
Circuit (2001 - producer)
Fast Sofa (2001 - producer)
Clean and Narrow (1999 - co-producer)
Twin Falls Idaho (1999 - producer)
Relax... It's Just Sex (1998 - producer)
Bird of Prey (1995 - executive producer)
Tollbooth (1994 - producer)
I Only You (1992 - co-producer)
Scorchers (1991 - co-producer)
My Mom's a Werewolf (1989 - producer)
Night Club (1989 - supervising producer)
Deathrow Gameshow (1987 - supervising producer)
Hunk (1987 - associate producer)

References

External links

American film producers
Living people
1959 births